Odevixibat, sold under the trade name Bylvay, is a medication for the treatment of progressive familial intrahepatic cholestasis (PFIC). It is taken by mouth. Odevixibat is a reversible, potent, selective inhibitor of the ileal bile acid transporter (IBAT).

The most common side effects include diarrhea, abdominal pain, hemorrhagic diarrhea, soft feces, and hepatomegaly (enlarged liver).

Odevixibat was approved for medical use in the United States and in the European Union in July 2021. The U.S. Food and Drug Administration considers it to be a first-in-class medication.

Medical uses 
In the United States, odevixibat is indicated for the treatment of pruritus in people three months of age and older with progressive familial intrahepatic cholestasis (PFIC). In the European Union it is indicated in people six months of age and older.

Mechanism of action 
Odevixibat is a reversible inhibitor of the ileal sodium/bile acid transporter which is the transporter responsible for reabsorption of the majority of bile acids in the distal ileum.  The reduced absorption of the bile acids in the distal ileum compounds and leads to a decrease in stimulation of FXR, decreasing the inhibition of bile acid synthesis.

Pharmacokinetics 
Odevixibat is > 99% protein-bound in-vitro.  A dose of Odevixibat that is 7.2 mg reaches a Cmax concentration of 0.47 ng/mL with an AUC (0-24h) of 2.19 h*ng/mL.  Adult and pediatric patients given the therapeautic dose of Odevixibat did not display plasma concentrations of the drug.  Odevixibat is eliminated majorly unchanged.  Odevixibat has an average half-life of 2.36 hours.

Adverse effects 
Common side effects of Odevixibat include diarrhea, stomach pain, vomiting, abnormal liquid function tests, and a deficiency in vitamins A,D, E and K.

Contraindications 
Odevixibat cannot be given to a child on a liquid diet.

History 
The US Food and Drug Administration granted the application for odevixibat orphan drug designation.

Society and culture

Legal status 
In May 2021, the Committee for Medicinal Products for Human Use (CHMP) of the European Medicines Agency (EMA) recommended granting a marketing authorization in the European Union for odevixibat for the treatment of PFIC in people aged six months or older. It was approved for medical use in the European Union in July 2021.

References

External links 
 
 

Orphan drugs
Thiadiazepines
Phenols
Thioethers
Amides
Carboxylic acids
Tertiary amines